Casey Combest (born September 15, 1980) is a former American track and field sprinter who saw prominence in the late 1990s and made a comeback in 2008. Casey's story was featured in a recent ESPN Classic film, Lay It on The Line: The Casey Combest Story.  He won a silver medal as part of Team USA in the  relay at the World Junior Championships of 1998 held in Annecy, France, finishing 0.01 behind winners Jamaica, 39.70 & 39.71. .  In 1999 he was the best high school sprinter in the nation.

References
"The Return of White Lightning" from ESPN
"White Lightning" from Sports Illustrated
"Henderson native no longer running for glory" from Evansville Courier & Press
"High School Career Over, Sprinter Combest Has Decisions" from Los Angeles Times

Living people
American male sprinters
1980 births